The Plymouth Rock is an American breed of domestic chicken. It was first seen in Massachusetts in the 19th century and for much of the early 20th century was the most widely kept chicken breed in the United States. It is a dual-purpose chicken, raised both for its meat and for its brown eggs. It is resistant to cold, easy to manage, and a good sitter.

History 

The Plymouth Rock was first shown in Boston in 1849, but then was not seen for another 20 years. In 1869, in Worcester, Massachusetts, D.A. Upham crossbred some black Java hens with a cock with barred plumage and a single comb; he selectively bred for barred plumage and clean (featherless) legs. His birds were shown in Worcester in 1869; the modern Plymouth Rock is thought to derive from them. Other people have been associated with the development of the Plymouth Rock, as have other chicken breeds including the brahma, the cochin (both white and buff), the dominique, and the white-faced black Spanish. According to The Livestock Conservancy, it originated from crossbreeding of Java birds with single-combed dominiques; or, based on genomic analysis, principally from the dominique, with substantial contribution from the Java and cochin and some input from other breeds.

The Plymouth Rock was included in the first edition of the American Standard of Perfection of the American Poultry Association in 1874. The barred plumage pattern was the original one; other colors were later added.

Because of its many good qualities—tasty meat, good egg production, resistance to cold, early feathering, easy management, good sitting—the Plymouth Rock became the most widespread chicken breed in the United States until the time of World War II. With the advent of industrial chicken farming, it was much used in the development of broiler hybrids but began to fall in popularity as a domestic fowl.

The Plymouth Rock is listed by the Livestock Conservancy as "recovering", meaning that there are at least 2,500 new registrations per year. Worldwide, numbers for the Plymouth Rock are reported at almost 33,000; about 24,000 are reported for the barred Plymouth Rock, and over 970,000 for the white variety.

Characteristics 
The Plymouth Rock has a single comb with five points; the comb, wattles and ear-lobes are bright red. The legs are yellow and unfeathered. The beak is yellow or horn-colored. The back is long and broad, and the breast is fairly deep.

In the United States, seven color varieties of the Plymouth Rock are recognized: barred, blue, buff, Columbian, partridge, silver-penciled and white. Ten plumage varieties are listed by the Entente Européenne d’Aviculture et de Cuniculture, of which five—barred, black, buff, Columbian and white—are recognized by the Poultry Club of Great Britain. In Australia, the barred variant is split into two separate colors, dark barred and light barred.

Use 

The Plymouth Rock is a dual-purpose breed and is kept both for its meat and for its large brown eggs, of which it lays about 200 per year.

In industrial agriculture, crosses of suitable strains of white Plymouth Rock with industrial strains of white Cornish constitute the principal stock of American broiler production.

References 

Chicken breeds originating in the United States
Chicken breeds